Macroglossum paukstadtorum is a moth of the  family Sphingidae. It is known from the Babar Islands.

It is a typical small Macroglossum species, but the colour is distinctively dull grey-brown. The forewing underside has the typical arrangement of pale and dark areas and transverse bands and lines of a small Macroglossum species, but the pattern is obscure and poorly contrasting. The hindwing upperside median band is narrow, dark-yellow and of variable clarity.

References

Macroglossum
Moths described in 2005